List of Rulers of Wituland

(Dates in italics indicate de facto continuation of office)

{|
Term
Incumbent
Notes
|-
|mfalume (Sultans)
|-
|Nabahani Dynasty
|-
|1858||Foundation of Wituland state by former ruler of Pate
|-
|1858 to 25 May 1885||Ahmad ibn Fumo Bakari, Mfalume
|-
|German Protectorate
|-
|25 May 1885 to 1888||Ahmad ibn Fumo Bakari, Mfalume
|-
|valign=top rowspan="2"|8 April 1885 to  1 July 1890||Gustav Denhardt, Resident||Brothers purchased 25-mile2 area from Sultan 
|- 
|Clemens Denhardt, Resident 
|-
|1888 to 1890||Fumo Bakari ibn Ahmad, Mfalume
|-
|18 June 1890||British Protectorate
|-
|1 July 1890||German Protectorate renounced
|-
|1890 to 1891||Bwana Shaykh ibn Ahmad, Mfalume
|-
|1891 to 1893||Fumo `Umar ibn Ahmad, Mfalume||1st Term
|-
|1893 to 7 July 1895||Interregnum
|-
|7 July 1895 to ?||Fumo `Umar ibn Ahmad, Mfalume||2nd Term
|}

Lists of African rulers
Lists of rulers of Kenya